Anarchism: A History of Libertarian Ideas and Movements is a 1962 book about the history of anarchism by George Woodcock.

References 

 
 
 
 
 
 
 
 
 
 
 

1962 non-fiction books
History books about anarchism
Books by George Woodcock
English-language books
World Publishing Company books